Fire Station No. 25 is a former fire station located near the borders of the Capitol Hill and First Hill neighborhoods of Seattle, Washington listed on the National Register of Historic Places. It is now a condominium apartment building.

See also
 List of landmarks in Seattle
 List of National Historic Landmarks in Washington (state)
 National Register of Historic Places listings in Seattle

References

External links
 

1900s architecture in the United States
Buildings and structures in Seattle
Defunct fire stations in Washington (state)
Fire stations completed in 1909
Fire stations on the National Register of Historic Places in Washington (state)
National Register of Historic Places in Seattle
Seattle Fire Department